Ze'ev Segal (13 January 1947 – 11 January 2011) was an Israeli lawyer, a professor of law at Tel Aviv University and a legal analyst for the newspaper Haaretz.

Segal was born in Mandate Palestine. He served in the Israel Defense Forces as a military correspondent for the Gadna newspaper Bemachane Gadna in 1965–1968. Segal received an LL.M degree from Hebrew University of Jerusalem. In 1982, he received a doctorate in law from Tel Aviv University. He worked as an assistant to Shimon Peres when he was Minister of Communications and Transport.

Journalism and legal career
In March 1973, several months before David Ben-Gurion died, Segal conducted the last comprehensive interview with Ben-Gurion. In 1985–1997, Segal served as an observer for the Israel Press Council and a member of its ethics tribunal. He was one of the drafters of the Kinneret Covenant (אמנת כנרת) which seeks to create a common ground for various currents in Israeli society (right-left, religious-secular). Segal was an associate of the Jerusalem Center for Public Affairs. He was also chairperson of the Israel Diaspora Forum at the World Zionist Organization and co-chairperson of the Forum of Law and Society.

Legacy and commemoration
Israeli Prime Minister Benjamin Netanyahu described Segal as "an exemplary figure, a journalist who struggled to advance democracy, human rights and the rule of law."

Published works
 The Right to Know in the Light of the Freedom of Information Act
 Freedom of the Press: Between Myth and Reality
 The Hatmaker: Discussions with Justice Aharon Barak (co-author Ariel Bendor)

References

External links
 Ze'ev Segal, on NFC 

1947 births
2011 deaths
Israeli legal scholars
Academic staff of Tel Aviv University
Haaretz people
Israeli opinion journalists
Israeli non-fiction writers
Israeli Jews